Foster Memorial Home is a historic sanatorium located at Huntington, Cabell County, West Virginia. It was built in 1924 to serve as a home for elderly widows.  It is a three-story, dark red brick building with limestone trim in the Colonial Revival style.

It was listed on the National Register of Historic Places in 2001.

References

Hospital buildings completed in 1924
Buildings and structures in Huntington, West Virginia
Colonial Revival architecture in West Virginia
Defunct hospitals in West Virginia
Hospital buildings on the National Register of Historic Places in West Virginia
National Register of Historic Places in Cabell County, West Virginia